Kadidia Maiga (born 6 April 1997) is a Malian basketball player for DUC Dakar and the Malian national team.

She represented Mali at the 2019 Women's Afrobasket.

References

External links

1997 births
Living people
Forwards (basketball)
Malian women's basketball players
21st-century Malian people
Malian expatriate basketball people in Senegal
People from Koulikoro Region